Fifth grade (called Grade 5 in some regions) is a year of education in many nations, and some other regions call it Year 5. In the United States, the fifth grade is the fifth and last year of elementary school in most schools. In other schools, it may be the first year of middle school. Students are usually 10–11 years old unless the child has been held back or skipped a grade. In England and Wales, the equivalent is Year 6. In Ireland, the equivalent is 5th class. In the US, a 5th grader is considered a senior if they are going to another school.
In Scotland a 10-11 year old is usually in primary, not Year 6.

In the United States, 41 states have implemented Common Core standards for 5th grade curriculum in English Language Arts/Mathematics.

Key English Language Arts Common Core standards for 5th grade students include:

 Ability to determine the theme of a book, story, or poem from details in the text
 Compare and contrast two or more characters, settings, or events in a story
 Describe how the narrator or speaker's point of view may influence how events are described
 Compare and contrast stories in the same genre.

Key Mathematics Common Core standards for 5th grade students include:

 Write and interpret numerical expressions in operations and algebraic thinking
 Ability to add, subtract, multiply, and divide fractions
 Convert like measurement units
 Understand volume as an attribute of 3-dimensional space
 Graph points on the coordinate plane
 Classify two-dimensional figures into categories based on their properties

In Math, Kids learn about operations with decimals, multiplying 3 digit numbers, long division, operations of fractions, order of operations, the metric system, x and y coordinates, volume of shapes, data and statistics.

In Social Studies, kids learn about Early American History from time periods 1491-1865. Historical events include Columbus landing in the United States, The Colombian Exchange, American Revolution, Westward Expansion, and Civil War.

In Science, the most common topics include moon phases, constellations, the solar system, ecosystems, the water cycle, weather, the states of matter, and chemical reactions.

In English, kids learn about reading, writing and vocabulary stragies, these include compare and contrast, finding the theme of a story, citing textual evidence, main idea, writing objective summaries, writing narratives, writing research reports, writing explanatory essays, writing persuasive and argumentative pieces, figurative language, Greek and Latin roots and context clues.

Australian equivalent

In Australia, this level of class is called Year 5. Children generally start this level between the ages of ten and eleven.

See also
Primary education
Educational stage
Education in England
Education in Scotland
Are You Smarter Than a 5th Grader?

References

5
Primary education